The Olympus Stylus SH-2 is a digital compact camera announced by Olympus Corporation on March 11, 2015. It differs from its predecessor, the Olympus Stylus SH-1, by the addition of raw format output, new nightscape modes and a Live Composite mode that helps with capturing star trails.

References

Stylus SX-2
Cameras introduced in 2015